Pauleta most commonly refers to Pedro Miguel Carreiro Resendes (born 1973), a Portuguese footballer.

Pauleta may also refer to:
 Pauleta (footballer, born 1997), Spanish footballer
 Pauleta (footballer, born 1998), Spanish footballer
 Pauleta (futsal player) (born 1994), Portuguese futsal player